The following is a list of awards and nominations received by American actor, writer, director, producer, comedian, and composer Mel Brooks. 

Over his 70 year career in film, theatre, and television Brooks has won an Academy Award, four Emmys, three Tony Awards, three Grammys, and has been nominated for six Golden Globes and one BAFTA Award. With his Tony wins for The Producers in 2001, he became one of only sixteen people who have won an Emmy, Grammy, Oscar and Tony Award. Additionally, he has received a Kennedy Center Honor in 2009, a Hollywood Walk of Fame star in 2010, the 41st AFI Life Achievement Award in 2013, a British Film Institute Fellowship in 2015, a National Medal of Arts in 2016, and a BAFTA Fellowship in 2017.

Major associations

Academy Awards

Emmy Awards

Grammy Awards

Tony Awards

Industry awards

British Academy Film Awards

Golden Globe Awards

Writers Guild of America Awards

Theatre

Drama Desk Awards

Drama League Awards

Laurence Olivier Awards

New York Drama Critics' Circles

Outer Critics Circle Awards

Special awards and honors

Miscellaneous awards

 Note: the Stinkers are listed twice, as the same ballot done in 1981 was revised in 2007.

References

External links
 
 

Awards and nominations
Lists of awards received by writer
Lists of awards received by film director
Lists of awards received by American actor